Hanna Barakat (Arabic: هناء بركات; born September 1, 1999) is a Los Angeles-born Palestinian-American runner. Barakat is a student-athlete at Brown University.

Her father Mohammed Barakat competed for the United States at the 1984 Summer Olympics in the sport of field hockey.

She was born in Los Angeles, California, U.S. Her brother Adam has played American football for Bucknell University in Lewisburg, Pennsylvania, U.S.

She competed in track & field at Flintridge Preparatory School in California.

The runner was one of five Palestinians representing the country at the 2020 Tokyo Olympics. She competed in the women's 100-meter sprint where she set the national record running a time of 12.16 seconds. Barakat also holds the Palestinian national record in the 400-meter sprint and 200-meter sprint.

References 

Living people
1999 births
Palestinian female sprinters
American female sprinters
Olympic athletes of Palestine
Athletes (track and field) at the 2020 Summer Olympics
Brown Bears women's track and field athletes
Track and field athletes from Los Angeles
American people of Arab descent
American people of Palestinian descent
People from Los Angeles
American Muslims
Olympic female sprinters